Dillon Anderson (July 14, 1906 – January 29, 1974) was an official in the federal government of the United States during the Eisenhower administration (1953–61). He served as the 2nd National Security Advisor from April 2, 1955, to September 1, 1956. He also was a member of the Draper Committee.

Biography
Anderson was born on July 14, 1906, in McKinney, Texas, the son of Joseph A. and Bessie Dillon. After attending Texas Christian University, Anderson received his B.S. from the University of Oklahoma (1927) and his LL.B. from Yale Law School (1929). He served in the United States Army during World War II (1942–1945) and earned the Army Commendation Ribbon and Legion of Merit. He worked on lend-lease materiel and military government planning, attaining the rank of colonel.

Anderson in 1940 was made partner in Houston, Texas, law firm of Baker Botts, before becoming National Security Advisor, Anderson was an official at the National Security Council from 1953 to 1955. He was elected a Fellow of the American Academy of Arts and Sciences in 1959.

Mr. Anderson resigned his post as special assistant in August, 1956, to return to his law practice. In 1958 he was elected chairman of the Texas National Bank. He was a director of Westinghouse Electric Corporation and of the Monsanto Chemical Corporation, and a trustee of the Carnegie Endowment for International Peace, of the Brookings Institution and of the Schlumberger Foundation.

He died on January 28, 1974, in Houston, Texas.

External links
 Records of the White House Office of the Special Assistant for National Security Affairs, Dwight D. Eisenhower Presidential Library

References

1906 births
1974 deaths
20th-century American lawyers
United States Army personnel of World War II
Fellows of the American Academy of Arts and Sciences
People from McKinney, Texas
Military personnel from Texas
Recipients of the Legion of Merit
United States National Security Advisors
University of Oklahoma alumni
Yale Law School alumni
People associated with Baker Botts